Sailing/Yachting is an Olympic sport starting from the Games of the 1st Olympiad (1896 Olympics in Athens, Greece). With the exception of 1904 and the canceled 1916 Summer Olympics, sailing has always been included on the Olympic schedule.
The Sailing program of 1924 consisted of a total of three sailing classes (disciplines). For each of the classes the event an elimination round, semi-finals and finals were scheduled. The French National Monotype 1924 was on the program from 10 to 13 July. The Metre classes (6 and 8) had their races from 21 to 26 July.

Venue

Meulan 

Meulan was the venue for the Olympic regatta's in the French National Monotype. The host club for the 1924 Olympic Sailing at Meulan was the Cercle de la Voile de Paris.
Like in 1900 the race conditions at Meulan during the Olympic regatta were not ideal. The light breeze during the first elimination series could hardly make the sailing interesting. When the wind picked up in the second series the conditions must have improved. During the first semi-final the wind came from South East. As a result, the yachts could sail most of the course without tacking or jibing, therefore not challenging the capabilities of the sailors. In the second semi-final however the wind shifted to East-North-East so that tacking was needed in the final legs of the laps.

Le Havre 

Le Havre was the venue for the Olympic regattas for the 6 and 8 Metre. The host club for the 1924 Olympic Sailing at Le Havre was the Société des Régates du Havre.
Due to the Easterly winds the courses at Le Havre were mostly reaches. As result sailing a windward leg was not really tested. This however was more or less custom for that time.

Course areas

Competition

Overview 

This was the first Olympic where just one boat per country per class was allowed.

Continents

Countries

Classes (equipment) 
After the enormous number of classes used during the Olympic sailing event of 1920 the International Yacht Racing Union decided that for 1924 just three classes would be used. The choice was made in favor of two Metre classes (6 and 8) and monotype (One Design) class.
{|class="wikitable" style="text-align:center"
  |-
  |colspan="7"|
    
  |-
  ! Class !! Type !! Venue !! Event !! Sailors !! First OG !! Olympics so far
  |-
  |style="text-align:left"|French National Monotype||Dinghy  ||Meulan  ||||1||1924||1
  |-
  |style="text-align:left"|6 Metre                            ||Keelboat||Le Havre||||3||1908||4
  |-
  |style="text-align:left"|8 Metre                            ||Keelboat    ||Le Havre    ||||5||1908||4
  |-
  |colspan="7"|'Legend:  = Mixed gender event
  |-
  |colspan="7"|
  
|}

 Race schedule 

 Medal summary 
Source:

 Medal table 

The official report used a point system to give participating nations an overall rank in the sport:

 Notes 

 Eugen Lunde, the first of the Olympic dynasty of Norwegian Lunde sailors:
 His son and daughter in law, Peder Lunde and Vibeke "Babben" Lunde, sailed together in the 1952 Olympics in the 5.5 Metre.
 His grandson, Peder Lunde Jr. won the gold in the Flying Dutchman in 1960 and the silver in the Star in 1968
 His great-grand daughter, Jeanette Lunde picked up Olympic sailing after an Olympic career in Downhill and Super-G. She sailed in the 470 at the 2000 Olympics.

 Other information 
 Italy was also entered in the 8 Metre. However, they did not'' participate.
 Germany was not invited.
 This is the first Olympic regatta where only one boat per class per country is allowed.

Sailors 
During the sailing regattas at the 1924 Summer Olympics among others the following persons were competing in the various classes:
 , one of the great 20th century's adventurer, travel writer and photographer, as well as a sportswoman, Ella Maillart
 , three times Olympic medalist, Léon Huybrechts
 , the famous French aircraft manufacturer and engineer, Louis Breguet

Further reading

References 

 
1924 Summer Olympics events
1924
1924 in sailing
Sailing competitions in France